Buisson is a French surname and place name. It may refer to:

People
 Ada Buisson (1839–1866), English author and novelist
 Alexandre Buisson (1886–1939), French World War I flying ace
 Émile Buisson (1902–1956), French gangster
 Ferdinand Buisson (1841–1932), French academic and Radical-Socialist politician
 François Albert-Buisson (1881–1961), French entrepreneur, economist, politician, historian
 Henri Buisson (1873–1944), French physicist
 Irène du Buisson de Longpré (died 1767), French noble, mistress to Louis XV of France
 Jean-François Buisson de Saint-Cosme (1667–1706), Canadian missionary,
 John Du Buisson (1871–1938), English Anglican priest
 Louis Léon Marie André Buisson (1889–1945), French Major General
 Marion Buisson (born 1988), French pole vaulter
 Patrick Buisson (born 1949), French historian, journalist and political advisor
 Robert du Mesnil du Buisson (1895–1986), French historian, soldier, and archaeologist
 Suzanne Buisson (1883–1944), French political activist and résistante
 Virginie Buisson (born 1969), French tennis player

Places

 Buisson (crater), lunar crater on the far side of the Moon named after physicist Henri Buisson
 Buisson, Vaucluse, commune in the Vaucluse department, France
 Canton of Le Buisson-de-Cadouin, former canton in the Dordogne department, France
 Le Buisson (disambiguation), any of several communes in France
 Verrières-le-Buisson, commune in the southern suburbs of Paris
 Villons-les-Buissons, commune in the Calvados department, France